Federation of European Microbiological Societies (FEMS) is an international European scientific organization, formed by the union of a number of national organizations; there are now 57 members from 41 European countries, regular and provisional. Members can apply for fellowships, grants and/or support when organising a meeting. FEMS facilitates exchange of scientific knowledge to all microbiologists in Europe and worldwide by publishing seven microbiology journals and organising a biennial congress for microbiologists around the world. It also initiates campaigns such as the European Academy of Microbiology (EAM).

Since 1977, it has been the sponsor of FEMS Microbiology Letters, a single journal. Now, FEMS publishes seven journals:

 FEMS Microbiology Ecology
 FEMS Microbiology Reviews
 FEMS Microbiology Letters
 FEMS Yeast Research
 Pathogens and Disease a journal preceded by FEMS Immunology and Medical Microbiology
 FEMS Microbes
 FEMS microLife

Originally published for the Society by Elsevier, then by Wiley-Blackwell, they are now published by Oxford University Press.

References

External links
Federation website
European Academy of Microbiology website

Biology in Europe
Pan-European scientific societies
Microbiology organizations
Scientific supraorganizations